Mount Pleasant is an unincorporated community in Perry Township, Delaware County, Indiana.

History
Mount Pleasant likely took its name from the Mount Pleasant United Brethren Church.

Geography

References

Unincorporated communities in Delaware County, Indiana
Unincorporated communities in Indiana